Pea streak virus (PeSV) is a plant pathogenic virus.

External links
ICTVdB - The Universal Virus Database: Pea streak virus
Family Groups - The Baltimore Method

Viral plant pathogens and diseases
Carlaviruses